LaZuz (לזוז) is Hadag Nachash's second studio album. It was released in 2003, and  features one of their most popular hits, "LaZuz" (To Move).

Track listing
"I Got Up" – 3:35 - Kamti - קמתי
"To Move" – 4:04 - Lazuz - לזוז
"Secret Of Success" – 3:08 - Sod Ha'Hatzlaha - סוד ההצלחה
"Numbers" – 4:26 - Misparim - מספרים
"Not Suckers" – 4:12 - Lo Frayerim - לא פראיירים
"Suckers" – 4:03 - Frayerim - פראיירים 
"Gabi & Debi" – 5:12 - Gabi VeDebi - גבי ודבי 
"The Garden of Eden"  – 0:46 - Gan Eden - גן עדן 
"The Strawberry Garden" – 4:28 - Gan HaTut - גן התות
"Bella Bellissima" – 3:42 - בלה בליסימה
"BelisDub" – 0:35 - בליס דאב
"The Strawberry Machine" – 3:32 - Mekhonat HaTut - מכונת התות
"It Wasn't Me" – 4:21 - Ze Lo Ani - זה לא אני

2003 albums
Hadag Nahash albums